Clubul Sportiv Universitatea Alexandria, commonly known as Universitatea Alexandria, or simply U Alexandria, is a Romanian women's football club based in Alexandria, Teleorman County, Romania. The team was founded in 2012, since then playing constantly in the Romanian leagues.

Universitatea Alexandria currently plays in the Liga I, first tier of the Romanian women's football system, after ranking 4th at the end of the 2017–18 season.

Chronology of names

Honours

Leagues
Liga II
Winners (2): 2013–14, 2016–17

Season by season

Current squad

}

Club officials

Board of directors

 Last updated: 19 January 2019
 Source:

Current technical staff

 Last updated: 19 January 2019
 Source:

References

External links
 

Women's football clubs in Romania
Football clubs in Teleorman County
University and college association football clubs in Romania
Association football clubs established in 2012
2012 establishments in Romania